The whiteline topminnow, Fundulus albolineatus, was a type of killifish first identified in 1891.  It was endemic to Big Spring, Madison County, Alabama, in the United States.

References

 
 
 

Whiteline Topminnow
Whiteline Topminnow
Whiteline Topminnow
Fish of North America becoming extinct since 1500
Freshwater fish of the United States
Whiteline Topminnow